Andrew Gallagher (born 1936) is an Irish retired hurler, manager and Gaelic games administrator. His league and championship career with the Offaly senior team lasted fourteen seasons from 1955 until 1969.

Honours

Player

Tullamore
 Offaly Senior Hurling Championship (3): 1955, 1959, 1964

Manager

Offaly
 All-Ireland Senior Hurling Championship (1): 1981
 Leinster Senior Hurling Championship (2): 1980, 1981

Selector

Offaly
 All-Ireland Senior Hurling Championship (2): 1985, 1994
 Leinster Senior Hurling Championship (7): 1984, 1985, 1988, 1989, 1990, 1994, 1995
 National Hurling League (1): 1990-91

References

1936 births
Living people
Tullamore hurlers
Offaly inter-county hurlers
Hurling managers
Hurling selectors